Justin Charles Gage (born January 24, 1981) is a former American football wide receiver. He played college football at the University of Missouri. He was originally drafted by the Chicago Bears in the fifth round of the 2003 NFL Draft. After four seasons with the Bears, he later played another four seasons with the Tennessee Titans.

College career
Gage attended the University of Missouri where he played both football and basketball. He was on the Tigers basketball team that reached the Elite Eight in the 2002 NCAA Men's Division I Basketball Tournament. In football, he started out as a quarterback, but moved to wide receiver in the spring of 2000. Coach Larry Smith converted him to a wide receiver and was fired that year.

Records
Gage holds the following records for football at the University of Missouri:

 Most receptions, game: 16 (at Bowling Green, 9/14/02) 
 Most receptions, season: 82 (2002)
 Most receptions, career: 200 — 1999–2002
 Most yards gained, game: 236 (vs. Baylor, 11/10/01)
 Most yards gained, career: 2,704 (Justin Gage, 1999–2002)
 Most consecutive games with a reception: 34 (2000–2002)

Professional career
Gage spent four years with the Chicago Bears, but signed with the Titans as a free agent following the 2006 season. In 2007 Gage tied for the Tennessee Titans lead with 55 receptions and led the team with 750 receiving yards.

Gage was released by the Titans on September 3, 2011.

Coaching career
In 2021, Gage was hired as the wide receivers coach for CBC High School near St. Louis, Missouri.

References

1981 births
Living people
American football wide receivers
Players of American football from Indianapolis
Players of American football from Missouri
Jefferson City High School alumni
Missouri Tigers men's basketball players
Missouri Tigers football players
Chicago Bears players
Tennessee Titans players
American men's basketball players
High school football coaches in Missouri